In molecular biology, glycoside hydrolase family 57 is a family of glycoside hydrolases.

Glycoside hydrolases  are a widespread group of enzymes that hydrolyse the glycosidic bond between two or more carbohydrates, or between a carbohydrate and a non-carbohydrate moiety. A classification system for glycoside hydrolases, based on sequence similarity, has led to the definition of >100 different families. This classification is available on the CAZy web site, and also discussed at CAZypedia, an online encyclopedia of carbohydrate active enzymes.

Glycoside hydrolase family 57 CAZY GH_57 comprises enzymes with several known activities; alpha-amylase, 4-alpha-glucanotransferase, α-galactosidase; amylopullulanase; branching enzyme. It includes a thermostable alpha-amylase with a broad substrate specificity from the archaebacterium Pyrococcus furiosus.

External links 
 GH57 in CAZypedia

References

EC 3.2.1
GH family
Protein domains